Up on the Ridge is the fifth studio album by American country music artist Dierks Bentley. It was released on June 8, 2010, via Capitol Records Nashville. The album produced two singles on the US Billboard Hot Country Songs chart with the title track and "Draw Me a Map".

Content
Unlike Bentley's previous albums, this album is a bluegrass-influenced album, mixed with country and Americana. It features many collaborations, including The Del McCoury Band, Alison Krauss, Chris Thile, and Miranda Lambert. Via his website, Bentley explained the reason behind Up on the Ridge, saying: “This album won’t come as a surprise to my hard core fans, they've asked me: ‘when are you going to make a bluegrass record?’ And I was just waiting for the right time. I didn't want this to be ‘Dierks Bentley and friends’ or a ‘Dierks does bluegrass’ kind of album. I wanted each song to have something special about it, and in the end I think each song really does have its own thing going on.”

In an interview with Billboard Magazine,  Capitol Records Nashville president and CEO Mike Dungan commented on Up on the Ridge saying that "The album was supposed to be a side project, but it's grown into something much more....He had a real sense of direction and made a vehicle for people to hopefully discover this music".

Singles
The title track is the first single from this album and was sent to radio stations on April 12, and debuted at #59 on the U.S. Billboard Hot Country Songs chart for the week of May 1, 2010. The song later peaked at #21 in late July 2010, making it the first single of Bentley's career to miss the Top 20 and the second to miss the Top 10, after My Last Name (from his self titled debut album) at No.17 in 2003. The second single from the album, "Draw Me a Map," was released to country radio on August 23, 2010. It was even less successful than the title track, with a peak of #33, becoming his third-lowest charting single to date, after "What the Hell Did I Say" from his album [[Black (Dierks Bentley album)|Black]], which peaked at #35 on Hot Country Songs and #46 on the Country Airplay chart.

Promotion
To promote his new album, Bentley started his Up on the Ridge Tour. The 24 show tour began in Portland, Oregon on April 21, 2010, and it continued through May 22, 2010, where it ended in Nashville, Tennessee.

Bentley also premiered the title song, and first single, on The Tonight Show with Jay Leno on April 27, 2010.

Reception

Commercial
The album debuted at number nine on the U.S. Billboard 200, number two on the U.S. Billboard Top Country Albums chart, and at number one on the U.S. Billboard Bluegrass Albums chart, selling nearly 39,000 copies in its first week of release. As of February 12, 2012, the album sold 244,000 copies in the US.

Critical

Upon its release, Up on the Ridge received very positive reviews from most music critics. At Metacritic, which assigns a normalized rating out of 100 to reviews from mainstream critics, the album received an average score of 80, based on 7 reviews, which indicates "generally favorable reviews".

Jessica Phillips with Country Weekly magazine rated the album four and a half stars out of five. She praised the sound of the album, saying that it "is built on a bedrock of bluegrass sensibility, but is colored by Dierks' various country, rock and folk influences." Jonathan Keefe with Slant Magazine also rated the album with four and a half out of five stars, commenting that the album's "overall aesthetic... proves Bentley's deep respect for— and his legitimate, intuitive understanding of— country traditions, even as he uses those traditions in forward-thinking, progressive ways."

Stephen Thomas Erlewine with Allmusic gave it four stars, and said it wasn't a traditional bluegrass album, saying "The very presence of a U2 song suggests that this is not a traditional bluegrass album, either in its content -- or in its approach, as he sometimes puts picking in the backseat, letting the instruments strum sweetly as he croons." Wade Jessen with Billboard'' called it "a thrilling ride from start to finish" and called the track "Down in the Mine" "the standout track".

Accolades

Track listing

Personnel

Production
 Brandon Bell - Assistant Engineer, Engineer, Mixing Assistant
 Joanna Carter - Art Direction
 Danny Clinch - Photography
 Michelle Hall - Art Producer
 Jeri Heiden - Design
 John Heiden - Design
 Scott Johnson - Production Assistant
 Ben Liscio - Assistant Engineer, Mixing Assistant
 Sangwook "Sunny" Nam - Mastering Associate
 Gary Paczosa - Engineer, Mixing
 Doug Sax - Mastering

Additional musicians
 Larry Atamanuik - Drums, Percussion
 Dierks Bentley - lead vocals
 Mike Bub - Bass
 Sam Bush - Fiddle, Mandolin, Vocal Harmony
 Jason Carter - Fiddle
 Stuart Duncan - Cello, Fiddle, Octave Fiddle
 Chris Eldridge - Acoustic Guitar
 John Gardner - Drums, Percussion
 Vince Gill - Vocal Harmony
 Rob Ickes - Dobro, Weissenborn
 Sonya Isaacs - Vocal Harmony
 Randy Kohrs - Weissenborn
 Paul Kowert - Bass
 Alison Krauss - Vocal Harmony
 Rob McCoury - Banjo
 Ronnie McCoury - Mandola, Mandolin
 Tim O'Brien -  Mandolin, Vocal Harmony
 Noam Pikelny - Banjo
 Jon Randall - Bass, Acoustic and Electric Guitar, Producer, Vocal Harmony
 Chris Stapleton - Vocal Harmony
 Bryan Sutton - Acoustic Guitar
 Chris Thile - Mandolin, Vocal Harmony
 Guthrie Trapp - Electric Guitar
 Scott Vestal - Banjo
 Gabe Witcher - Fiddle, Vocal Harmony
 Glenn Worf - Bass

Chart performance

Album

References

2010 albums 
Albums produced by Jon Randall
Bluegrass albums
Capitol Records Nashville albums 
Dierks Bentley albums